Marianne Rendón is an American actress known for her role as Susan Atkins in the biopic film Charlie Says about the life of Charles Manson and as  Julia "Jules" Langmore on the Bravo dark comedy television series Imposters.

Early life and education
Rendón was born to Robert (Bob) Rendón, a sound technician and Valerie Lemon-Rendón, a singer. She was raised in New Rochelle, NY. Marianne was educated at Bard College in upstate New York. While at Bard, she and friend Lola Kirke formed band "Sheroes", an all-female country feminist band. She graduated from the Juilliard School in 2016. She was married to actor and teacher Ker Wells until his death from pancreatic cancer on August 30, 2019.

Career
Rendón played Julia "Jules" Langmore, and was one of the co-stars, in the 2017 television series Imposters.

In July 2017, she was brought in to replace Zosia Mamet in the role of Patti Smith in the film Mapplethorpe, a biopic based on the photographer Robert Mapplethorpe.

In March 2018, she was cast to play the role of Susan Atkins in the biopic Charlie Says about the life of Charles Manson.

Filmography

Film

Television

References

External links

Living people
American film actresses
American television actresses
Bard College alumni
Juilliard School alumni
1990 births
21st-century American actresses